Route 208 is a collector highway in the Canadian province of Nova Scotia.

It is located in Lunenburg County and Queens County and connects New Germany at Trunk 10 with South Brookfield at Trunk 8.

Communities 
South Brookfield
North Brookfield
Pleasant River
Colpton
Nineveh
Hemford
Simpsons Corner
New Germany

See also 
List of Nova Scotia provincial highways

References 

Nova Scotia provincial highways
Roads in Lunenburg County, Nova Scotia
Roads in the Region of Queens Municipality